The Treatment are an English hard rock band, which formed in Cambridge, England, in 2008. Previously, the band members had played together under the moniker, 'God Sacks Man'.

In 2011 the band played at Sonisphere Festival on the Jägermeister stage. Later in 2011, a UK tour arranged by the Powerage record label featured The Treatment, alongside New Device, Lethargy and Million Dollar Reload.

After the Medication For The Nation Tour in the United Kingdom in December 2011 the band went on tour in support of Alice Cooper, Steel Panther and Thin Lizzy.

The first album "This Might Hurt" was released on 19 September on Universal Music Group and Spinefarm Records.

Later, on 21 April 2012, The Treatment and Spinefarm released an EP with covers of songs by such bands as Electric Light Orchestra, Slade and others. The disc was titled "Then and Again".

The Treatment played on the Pepsi Max Stage at Download Festival in Castle Donington, UK on 9 June 2012.

In 2012 the band went on tour with Kiss and Mötley Crüe in their The Tour. In 2013 they played at Ozzfest in Japan and four dates with Slash in the UK.
They also supported Status Quo on their Frantic Four reunion tour with Quo's original line-up in 2013.

On 3 February 2014 the second full-length album entitled "Running With The Dogs" was released.

In partnership with Reckless Love Treatment has released a mini-compilation on 12-inch orange vinyl to mark Record Store Day in 2014. The compilation was released by Spinefarm Records and includes 2 tracks from each band.

On 29 March 2015 the band announced that their frontman Matt Jones would be leaving The Treatment.

On 7 May 2015, the band announced that Mitchel Emms and Tao Grey were the new members of The Treatment. The band had been playing some secret shows with this line-up, then on 25 July 2015 they played at the Steelhouse Festival alongside Y&T, Nazareth and UFO. In September 2015, the band were special guests on tour in the UK with W.A.S.P. On 7 October 2015, the group was signed by the Italian label Frontiers records.

In September 2017, vocalist Mitchel Emms parted ways with the band. In December 2017, Tom Rampton (ex-Freeway Mad) was announced as the new vocalist.

In January, the single "Bite Back" was released, which is part of the upcoming album Power Crazy, which was announced for release on 22 March, followed by a tour to support it.

In early March, the label released a video for the song "Hang Them High", later another music video for "Luck of the draw" was released, which has radically different style comparing to the typical works of the band.

On 13 March 2019 the fourth album, called Power Crazy, was released. Utilizing guitar parts from earlier records e.g. Hang Them High and The Doctor 

2020 is the year of the band making the new fifth studio album.

Members

Current members 
Andy Milburn – bass player (2020–Present)
Tagore Grey – guitar/backing vocals (2008–Present)
Dhani Mansworth – drums  (2008–Present)
Tao Grey – guitar (2015–Present)
Tom Rampton – vocals (2017–Present)

Former members 
Ben Brookland  – guitar  (2008–2013)
Matt Jones – vocals (2008–2015)
Rick "Swoggle" Newman – bass  (2008–2020)
Jake Pattinson  - guitar  (2013-2014)
Fabian "Dee" Dammers – guitar  (2014–2015)
Mitchel Emms - Vocals (2015 - 2017)

Discography

Studio albums 
This Might Hurt (2011)
Running With the Dogs (2014)
Generation Me (2016)
Power Crazy (2019)
Waiting for Good Luck (2021)

EPs 
Then and Again (Covers) (2012)
Reckless Love, The Treatment — Die Hard / Angel Falling (12", Ora) (2014)

Music videos / Singles
"Drink, Fuck, Fight" (2011)
"Shake the Mountain" (2011)
"Departed" (2011)
"The Doctor" (2012)
"Nothing to Lose But Our Minds" (2012)
"I Bleed Rock & Roll" (2013)
"Emergency" (2014)
"Running With the Dogs" (2014)
"The Outlaw" (2014)
"Let It Begin" (2016)
"The Devil" (2016)
"Generation Me" (2016)
"Bloodsucker" (2016)
"Backseat Heartbeat" (2016)
"Hang Them High" (2019)
"Luck of the Draw" (2019)
"Let's Get Dirty" (2019)
"Bite Back" (2019)

References

External links
 Discogs artist page

English hard rock musical groups
English heavy metal musical groups
Musical groups established in 2008
Spinefarm Records artists
Musical groups from Cambridge